John Henry Dimond (December 28, 1918 – June 1985) was an American jurist who served as a justice of the Supreme Court of Alaska from August 7, 1959 to November 30, 1971. He was one of Alaska's inaugural justices, serving along with Buell Nesbett and Walter Hodge on the court's first ever bench. Born in Valdez, Alaska, he was the only son of Anthony Dimond, and was briefly in private practice with his father prior to his death. The state courthouse in his adopted hometown of Juneau, Alaska, located across the street from the Alaska State Capitol, is named in his honor.

Early life 
Dimond was born December 28, 1918, in Valdez, to Dorothea M. Dimond, and future Valdez mayor & U.S. Delegate Anthony Dimond, the 2nd of 3 children. He grew up with Anthony's godson, Bill Egan, who would become Alaska's first state Governor. In the early 1930s, Egan would give Dimond and future Anchorage Mayor George A. Sullivan boxing training, leading to an incident one time where Dimond punched Egan so hard that he fell out of a window. Sullivan & Dimond waited for minutes for Egan to re-appear, although, as time went on, Egan was nowhere to seen. Egan suddenly burst through the door, saying "OK boys, the lesson is over for today."

Dimond would go on expeditions with Father Hubbard, nicknamed the "Glacier Priest". Dimond was seriously burned in a boating accident, while helping the construction of the Shrine of St. Therese in Juneau. Dimond was burned by the fumes from a nearby leaking gasoline tank which had exploded.

Dimond served in the U.S. Military during World War II, winning the Silver Star, the Bronze Star, the Purple Heart, the Asiatic Pacific Medal with two bronze stars, and the Philippine Liberation Service Medal with a bronze star.

Career 
Dimond was appointed to the inaugural state supreme court by Governor Egan, on August 7, 1959. His law clerks included future Alaska Chief Justice Walter L. Carpeneti. After his retirement from the court, on November 30, 1971, Dimond continued to sit from time to time as a senior justice until his death at 66, in Seattle, Washington.

References

1918 births
1985 deaths
People from Juneau, Alaska
People from Valdez, Alaska
Justices of the Alaska Supreme Court
20th-century American judges